The Carson-Annis Ferry Farm, near Morgantown, Kentucky, United States, is a historic area which is listed on the National Register of Historic Places.  It was originally listed as Carson's Landing in 1998 but the listing's boundaries were increased and the listing name was changed in 2007.

References

National Register of Historic Places in Butler County, Kentucky
Greek Revival architecture in Kentucky
Buildings and structures completed in 1904
Buildings and structures completed in 1853
Farms on the National Register of Historic Places in Kentucky
1904 establishments in Kentucky